Obywatel G.C. was a Polish supergroup band created by Polish rock musician Grzegorz Ciechowski. The band was formed in 1986, after Ciechowski attempted to pursue a solo career after breaking up with another band called Republika. The group had different musicians from different genres, chosen by Ciechowski as the best jazz men and rockers in Poland. These people were Jan Borysewicz, one of the founders of Lady Pank, Wojciech Karolak, a notable jazz and blues musician, Krzysztof Ścierański, bass guitarist, and José Torres, a Cuban-Polish drummer. In total, they have had a total of 5 LPs and several singles. The band became notable in 1988 with the album Tak! Tak!, which had at the most 300,000 copies circulating and was awarded a gold disc. The band was disbanded in 1992, when Ciechowski reentered Republika.

Discography

Studio albums 
 1986 – Obywatel G.C., Tonpress
 1988 – Tak! Tak!, Polskie Nagrania Muza
 1989 – Stan strachu (made for the Janusz Kijowski film Stan strachu, Polskie Nagrania Muza)
 1992 –  Obywatel świata (made for the film/play Obywatel świata, Arston)

Compilation albums 
 1993 – Selekcja, Sonic
 2007 – Gwiazdy polskiej muzyki lat 80., TMM Polska / Planeta Marketing

EP 
 1989 – Obywatel G.C. (EP), ZPR Records

Box 
 2004 – Kolekcja (box), EMI Music Poland – antologia zawierająca albumy Obywatela G.C.

Single 
 1986 – single "Spoza linii świata" / "Mówca", Tonpress
 1986 – single "Paryż – Moskwa 17:15" / "Odmiana przez osoby", Tonpress

Music Charts

References

External links 
 

Polish rock music groups